Saint Paphnutius the Bishop is an Egyptian saint from the tenth century AD.

He was initially a monk in the Nitrian Desert. He exerted harsh asceticism and worship, ate dry beans, and fasted for many days in a row. He was later ordained a priest, and remained in the wilderness for 35 years. He was ordained bishop by Pope Philotheos of Alexandria, but remained in his rough asceticism even after his ordination. He remained bishop for 32 years, and departed on 11 Pashons.

Sources
Coptic Synexarion

Coptic Orthodox saints
10th-century Coptic Orthodox bishops
10th-century Christian saints